Nils Paul "Palle" Danielsson (born 15 October 1946) is a Swedish jazz double bassist born in Stockholm, Sweden. From 1974 to 1979, he was a member of Keith Jarrett's quartet. He is the brother of pianist Monica Dominique.

Career
Danielsson's childhood was an especially musical one; his first instrument was the harmonica, which he started playing at the age of two. By age eight he was playing violin, which he continued to play and study for about five years. Around this time he became interested in jazz music and started to play double bass. By the time he was fifteen, Danielsson was playing professionally. Having studied at the Stockholm Royal Academy of Music (1962–1966), he began to play with Scandinavian musicians such as Eje Thelin, Bobo Stenson, and Jan Garbarek and took up international collaborations, e.g. with Lee Konitz and Steve Kuhn.

Danielsson has worked with Bill Evans, Keith Jarrett, Kenny Wheeler, Geri Allen, Michel Petrucciani, Charles Lloyd, Peter Erskine, Elvin Jones, Ben Webster, Charlie Shavers, George Russell, Albert Mangelsdorff, Enrico Rava, Collin Walcott, Tomasz Stańko, and John Taylor. He has also led and co-led several bands in Sweden, and released several recordings.

Discography

As leader
 Contra Post (Caprice, 1994)
 Opening with Jon Fält (MA, 2009)
 Togetherness with Monica Dominique (Dominique, 2012)
 Trio M/E/D with Peter Erskine, Rita Marcotulli (Abeat, 2015)
 On the Brink of a Lovely Song with Christina von Bülow, Eliot Zigmund (Storyville, 2018)

As sideman
With Lennart Åberg
 Seven Pieces (2000)
 Green Prints (2002)

With Peter Erskine
 You Never Know (ECM, 1992)
 Time Being (ECM, 1993)
 As It Is (ECM, 1995)
 Juni (ECM, 1997)

With Jan Garbarek
 Witchi-Tai-To (ECM, 1974)
 Dansere (ECM, 1975)

With Keith Jarrett
 Belonging (ECM, 1974)
 My Song (ECM, 1978)
 Personal Mountains (ECM, 1979)
 Nude Ants (ECM, 1979)
 Sleeper (ECM, 2012)

With Lee Konitz
 Alto Summit with Pony Poindexter, Phil Woods and Leo Wright (MPS, 1968) 
 Altissimo  with Gary Bartz, Jackie McLean and Charlie Mariano (Philips, 1973)

With Karin Krog
 Joy (1968)
 Different Days, Different Ways  (1974)

With Christof Lauer
 Christof Lauer (CMP, 1989)
 Bluebells (CMP, 1992)

With Charles Lloyd
 Montreux 82 (Elektra/Musician, 1983)
 A Night in Copenhagen (Blue Note, 1985)
 Fish Out of Water (ECM, 1989)

With Ale Möller and Lena Willemark
 The Nordan Suite (ECM, 1994)
 Agram Ale (ECM, 1997)

With Michel Petrucciani
 Live at the Village Vanguard (Blue Note, 1984)
 Pianism (Blue Note, 1985)

With Enrico Rava
 The Pilgrim and the Stars (ECM, 1975)
 The Plot (ECM, 1976)
 L' Opera Va (1993)

With John Taylor
 Angel of the Presence (2005)
 Whirlpool (2008)
 Giulia's Thursdays (2012)

With others
 Jan Allan-70, Jan Allan/Nils Lindberg (1998)
 Some Aspects of Water, Geri Allen (Storyville, 1996)
 Togetherness, Anouar Brahem (Dominique, 2012)
 Al Cohn and Zoot Sims, Al Cohn/Zoot Sims (1982)
 Collaborations, Marilyn Crispell (2009)
 Capricer Med, Eric Ericson/Orphei Draengar (1999)
 Stockholm 1965, Bill Evans (2007)
 Traction Avant, Alessandro Galati (1995)
 Laurita, Richard Galliano (Dreyfus, 1996)
 Music for Two Brothers, Rolf Kühn (1998)
 Watch What Happens!, Steve Kuhn (MPS, 1968)
 Fyra, Magnus Lindgren (2012)
 People Places Times and Faces, Fredrik Lundin (1993)
 Interface, Adam Makowicz (1987)
 The Wide Point, Albert Mangelsdorff (1975)
 Koine, Rita Marcotulli (2003)
 Open, Lina Nyberg (1998)
 For All It Is, Barre Phillips (1971)
 Rena Rama, Rena Rama (1998)
 Inside Pictures-A Tribute to Lars Gullin Vol. 2, Bernt Rosengren (2002)
 Responsorium, Dino Saluzzi (ECM, 2001)
 Litania: Music of Krzysztof Komeda,  Tomasz Stańko (ECM, 1997)
 Satu, Edward Vesala (ECM, 1977)
 Spring Mot Ulla-Spring!, Cornelis Vreeswijk (1971)
 Hidden History, Eric Vloeimans (2004)
 Grazing Dreams, Collin Walcott (ECM, 1977)
 Concord, Jens Winther (2005)
 Sanctuary, Barney Wilen (Ida, 1991)

References

1946 births
Musicians from Stockholm
Free jazz double-bassists
Swedish jazz double-bassists
Swedish jazz composers
Male jazz composers
Post-bop double-bassists
Living people
21st-century double-bassists
21st-century Swedish male musicians
Rena Rama members